Phillipsia lutea is a species of fungus in the family Sarcoscyphaceae. It was originally described in 1969 by William Clark Denison from collections made in Costa Rica.

References

External links

Fungi described in 1969
Fungi of Central America
Sarcoscyphaceae